The men's 800 metres event at the 2004 World Junior Championships in Athletics was held in Grosseto, Italy, at Stadio Olimpico Carlo Zecchini on 13, 14 and 16 July.

Medalists

Results

Final
16 July

Semifinals
14 July

Semifinal 1

Semifinal 2

Heats
13 July

Heat 1

Heat 2

Heat 3

Heat 4

Heat 5

Participation
According to an unofficial count, 31 athletes from 23 countries participated in the event.

References

800 metres
800 metres at the World Athletics U20 Championships